Nero Continental is a UCI Continental cycling team which was founded in Australia in 2016.

Overview
The team is based in the Sydney suburb of Balmain. The sports director is Luke Manion. Veteran cyclist Chris Miller was listed as the owner in 2018.

As of 2020, Nero raced on Devel bicycles with a Campagnolo groupset and Maxxis tyres. Sponsors have included Aptium Financial Services, Atelier d’Velo, Athletes Gel, Bianchi, CeramicSpeed, KOM Financial Advice, Mercedes-Benz, Shimano, Sony, and the Sydney Uni Velo Club, which is the source of many of the team's riders.

Team roster

Major wins
Sources:

2019
  Overall Tour of the Tropics, Jay Vine
Stage 1, Samuel Hill
Stage 3, Jay Vine
 Stage 3 Tour de Filipinas, Samuel Hill
 Stage 4 Tour de Filipinas, Jesse Coyle
 Tour Great South Coast
Stage 2, Rylee Field
Stage 6, Jesse Coyle
 Modesto, Samuel Hill
2020
 Stage 1 National Tour NRS, Jay Vine

References

External links

UCI Continental Teams (Oceania)
Cycling teams based in Australia
Cycling teams established in 2016